Magdalena Luther (4 May 152920 September 1542) was the third child and second daughter of German priest and iconic figure of the Protestant Reformation, Martin Luther and his wife, Katharina von Bora. She died at the age of thirteen.

Life
Magdalena was born in Wittenberg as the couple's third child and second but first surviving daughter, as her older sister, Elisabeth, had died the year before Magdalena was born, at the age of seven months. Luther reported to Nicholas von Amsdorf that Katharina had gone into labour and after three hours, had been delivered, without any difficulties, of a perfectly healthy baby daughter. She was a much loved child and she was nicknamed Lenchen inside her family. Luther also asked Amsdorf to be godfather to "the said little heathen and to help her [enter] holy Christendom through the holy, precious sacrament of baptism. During the Diet of Augsburg, in 1530, Luther received a portrait of the one-year-old Magdalena from his wife and thanked her by offering suggestions for weaning that he had received from Argula von Grumbach, one of the few women whose writing in favour of the Protestant Reformation are extant.

Death

Magdalena died in Wittenberg in her father's arms after a prolonged illness. Luther's letters and Table Talk testify that the death of Magdalena was an extremely trying time for both her parents and her older brother Hans, who was summoned home to be with his sister at the very end. It was later written:

References

Bibliography

1529 births
1542 deaths
People from Wittenberg
Martin Luther
German Lutherans
Magdalena
Child deaths